Never Too Late is a 2020 Australian comedy film directed by Mark Lamprell and starring James Cromwell, Shane Jacobson,  and Jacki Weaver.

Plot
Four former prisoners of war that famously broke out of their camp during the Vietnam War are all now residents of the same retirement home for returned veterans. They are not allowed to leave as they are under the Mental Health Act. The four men devise a plan to break out of the home in an attempt to fulfil their individual dreams.

Cast
 James Cromwell as Jack Bronson
 Dennis Waterman as Jeremiah Caine
 Roy Billing as James Wendell
 Shane Jacobson as Bruce Wendell
 Jack Thompson as Angus Wilson
 Jacki Weaver as Norma McCarthy
 Zachary Wan as Elliot

Production
Never Too Late was directed by Mark Lamprell, written by Grant Carter and Luke Preston, produced by Antony I. Ginnane and David Lightfoot, with executive producers Jack Christian and Kirk D'Amico. 

The film was shot in Adelaide, South Australia throughout March and April 2019.

Release
The film premiered at Adelaide's Young at Heart Festival on 19 February 2020. It was scheduled to be released digitally in the United States on 10 July 2020.

It was distributed by R&R Films.

References

External links
 
 
 
 

2020 films
2020 comedy-drama films
2020s English-language films
Australian comedy-drama films
Films shot in Adelaide
Films set in South Australia
Films directed by Mark Lamprell
Screen Australia films
2020s Australian films